The Fighting Grin is a 1918 American silent comedy Western film directed by Joseph De Grasse and starring Franklyn Farnum, Edith Johnson and J. Morris Foster.

Cast
 Franklyn Farnum as Billy Kennedy
 Edith Johnson as Margie Meredith
 J. Morris Foster as Harold De Vanderveer
 Charles Hill Mailes as Otis Kennedy 
 Fred Montague as Amos Meredith

References

External links
 

1918 films
1918 Western (genre) films
American black-and-white films
Films directed by Joseph De Grasse
Silent American Western (genre) films
Universal Pictures films
1910s English-language films
1910s American films